is a Japanese actor, voice actor and singer. He was born in Tokorozawa, Saitama, and works for Aoni Production. 
Among his many roles, he is best known as the voices of Trunks (Dragon Ball Z), Hanamichi Sakuragi (Slam Dunk), Ryo Sanada (Yoroiden Samurai Troopers), Parn (Record of Lodoss War), Coco/Kōji Kokoda (Yes! PreCure 5), Ky Kiske (Guilty Gear), Yukimura Sanada (Samurai Warriors, as well in Warriors Orochi series), Dororo (Sgt. Frog) and Mao (Code Geass).

Biography
In May 2015, he married fellow voice actress Yuka Saitō and they have a child.

He and his wife later had a second child born on November 13 2021.

Filmography

Television animation
1988
 Saint Seiya, Wolf Nachi
 Transformers: Super God Masterforce, Clouder/Double Clouder
 Yoroiden Samurai Troopers, Ryo Sanada
1989
 Akuma-kun, Kirihito
 Dragon Ball Z, Piegerro
 Momotaro Densetsu, Tarou Urashima
1990
 Knights of Ramune & 40, Lamune
 Brave Exkaiser, Green Laker
 RPG Densetsu Hepoi, Ryuuto
1991
 Getter Robo Go, Gou Ichimonji
 Dragon Ball Z, Trunks
1992
 Ashita e Free Kick, Shun Godai
 Tetsujin 28-go FX, Saburo Natsuki
 Super Bikkuriman, Phoenix
1993
 Slam Dunk, Hanamichi Sakuragi
1995
 Mobile Suit Gundam Wing, Mueller
 Dragon Ball Z, Trunks, Upa
 Sorcerer Hunters, Kou
1996
 Knights of Ramune & 40 Fire, Lamuness I
 Gegege no Kitarō, Kasa-bake
 Dragon Ball GT, Trunks
1997
 Clamp School, Takeshi Shukaido
 Revolutionary Girl Utena, Kyoichi Saionji
 Shinkai Densetsu Meremanoid, Madam
 Bamboo Bears, Bamboo Lee
1998
 Steam Detectives, Le Bled
 His and Her Circumstances, Hiroyuki Miyazawa
 Kindaichi Shounen no Jikenbo, Kawashima
 Shadow Skill, Darkness, Snake Man
 Detective Conan, Osamu Honda
2000
 Excel Saga, Key
 Saiyuki, Kougaiji
 Digimon Adventure 02, Revolmon
 Boys Be..., Young Man
 Descendants of Darkness, Tetsuhiro Abiko
2001
 Super GALS!, Takeru
 Run=Dim, Suguru Saeki
2002
 Spiral, Kousuke Asazuki
 Midnight Horror School, Docky
 Naruto, Gōzu
 Pecola, Jabatto-san
 One Piece, Koza
2003
 Inuyasha, Bankotsu
 Saiyuki Reload, Kougaiji
 D.N.Angel, Krad
 Tenshi na Konamaiki, Pierre
 Di Gi Charat Nyo!, John
 Planetes, Sully
 Pluster World, Gingardo
 One Piece, Zap
2004
 Sgt. Frog, Dororo, Dokuku
 Saiyuki Gunlock, Kougaiji
 Samurai 7, Hyogo
 Hit o Nerae!, Kenjiro Kurume
 Ring ni Kakero 1, Ishimatsu Katori
2005
 Gaiking: Legend of Daikū-maryū, Jian Xin, Haccho
 Moeyo Ken, Ukon Tanaka
 Speed Grapher, Ran Yurigaoka
 Solty Rei, Will
 Beet the Vandel Buster, Rosegoat
2006
 Ergo Proxy, Rogi
 Sumomomo Momomo, Tenka Koganei
 Demashitaa! Powerpuff Girls Z, Hiro
 Naruto, Gouzu
 Happy Lucky Bikkuriman, Prince Yamato
 Yume Tsukai, Michiaki Mishima
 One Piece, Jaguar D. Saul
2007
 Yes! Precure 5, Coco
 Gegege no Kitarō, Makoto Washio
 Code Geass: Lelouch of the Rebellion, Mao
 Darker than Black, Zhi-Jun Wei, EPR Member (ep 16)
 MapleStory, Anji
2008
 Yes! Precure 5 GoGo!, Coco/Kōji Kokoda
 Skip Beat!, Ushio Kurosaki
 Tytania, Alses Tytania
 Sands of Destruction, Frog Master
2009
 Sōten Kōro, Xiahou Dun
 Beyblade: Metal Fusion, Busujima
2010
 Inuyasha: The Final Act, Magatsuhi, Demon of the Shikon Jewel
 Super Robot Wars OG: The Inspector, Vigagi
 Digimon Xros Wars, Kiriha Aonuma, Ballistamon, Bagramon, Greymon, ZekeGreymon
 The Animal Conference on the Environment, Pao the Panda
 Dragon Ball Kai, Trunks
 Naruto Shippuden, Shiranami
 Ring ni Kakero 1: Shadow, Ishimatsu Katori
2011
 Sekaiichi Hatsukoi, Hasegawa
 Fujilog, Osamu Fujiyama
 Maji de Watashi ni Koi Shinasai!!, Gakuto Shimazu
 Yondemasu yo, Azazel-san, Sariel
 Ring ni Kakero 1: Sekai Taikai-hen, Ishimatsu Katori
 One Piece, Gol D Roger (Young)
2012
 Gon, Jack
 Saint Seiya Omega, Unicorn Jabu
 Driland, Rogai
 Nyaruko: Crawling with Love, Nyaruo
2013
 Kingdom, Jiang Zhang
2014
 Captain Earth, Reito Hirosue/Pointer
 Keroro Gunso, Dororo
 Phi Brain: Kami no Puzzle, Zagadka
 Minna Atsumare! Falcom Gakuen, Adol, Phan
 World Trigger, Masafumi Shinoda
2015
 Samurai Warriors, Sanada Yukimura
 Dragon Ball Kai, Trunks
 Dragon Ball Super, Trunks
 Magic Kaito 1412, Detective Delon
 Minna Atsumare! Falcom Gakuen SC, Phan
2016
 Dragon Ball Super, Future Trunks
 One Piece, Karasu
2017
 Dragon Ball Super, Lavender, Narirama
2018
Major 2nd, Fujii
Bakutsuri Bar Hunter, Tōma Tachitsute
Black Clover, Ladros
2019
Senki Zesshou Symphogear XV, Enki
Kishiryu Sentai Ryusoulger, Pi-Tan
2020
Digimon Adventure:, Joe Kido
Noblesse, Ragar Kertia
2021
Yashahime: Princess Half-Demon, Mayonaka/Mahiruma
2023
Bungo Stray Dogs 4, Mushitarō Oguri

Original video animation (OVA)
 Guyver (1989), Sho Fukamachi/Guyver
 Megazone 23 Part III (1989), Eiji Takanaka
 Ys (1989-1991), Adol Christin
 Record of Lodoss War (1990), Parn
 Ys II: Castle in the Heavens (1992-1993), Adol Christin
 Casshan: Robot Hunter (1993), Tetsuya Azuma/Casshan
 Ranma ½ (1994), Shinnosuke
 Saint Seiya: Hades (2002-2006), Capricorn Shura
 Tales of Phantasia (2004-2006), Cless Alvein (Cress Albane)
 Dogs: Bullets & Carnage (2009), Magato

Theatrical animation
 Akira (1988), Kai (debut)
 Saint Seiya: Warriors of the Final Holy Battle (1989), Sailors
 Mobile Suit Gundam F91 (1991), Dorel Ronah
 Inuyasha the Movie: Fire on the Mystic Island (2004), Jūra
 Dragon Ball Z: Battle of Gods (2013), Trunks, Gotenks
 Short Peace (2013), Frog
 Dragon Ball Z: Resurrection 'F' (2015), Future Trunks
 Dragon Ball Super: Broly (2018), Trunks
 Free! Road to the World: The Dream (2019), Ryuji Azuma
 Dragon Ball Super: Super Hero (2022), Trunks, Gotenks

Video games
 SegaSonic the Hedgehog (1993), Sonic the Hedgehog
 Dragon Ball Z 2: Super Battle (1995), Future Trunks
 Abalaburn (1998), BloodRakugaki Showtime (1999), John Calibur
 Rockman DASH 2 ~Episode 2: Ooi Naru Isan~ (2000), Gaga
 Super Robot Wars Alpha (2000), Dorel Ronah
 Super Robot Wars Alpha 2 (2003), Dorel Ronah
 Advance Guardian Heroes (2004), Dylan
 Blood Will Tell (2004), Tahōmaru
 Saint Seiya: The Sanctuary (2005), Capricorn Shura
 Saint Seiya: The Hades (2007), Capricorn Shura
 Super Robot Wars: Original Generations (2007), Vigagi
 Code Geass: Lost Colors (2008), Mao
 Cosmic Break (2008), Lios
 Tales of the World: Radiant Mythology Cless Alvein (Cress Albane) Ys Seven (2009), Adol Christin
 Super Robot Wars NEO (2009), Lamune
 Ys vs. Trails in the Sky (2010), Adol Christin
 The Sly Collection (2011), Sly Cooper (Japanese dub, only on PS3 version)
 Tales of the World: Radiant Mythology 3 (2011), Cless Alvein (Cress Albane)
 PlayStation Move Heroes (2011), Sly Cooper (Japanese dub)
 Saint Seiya Senki (2011), Capricorn Shura
 Heroes Phantasia (2012), Dororo
 Tales of the World: Reve Unitia (2012), Cless Alvein (Cress Albane)
 PlayStation All-Stars Battle Royale (2013), Sly Cooper (Japanese dub)
 Guilty Gear Xrd -SIGN- (2014), Ky Kiske
 Guilty Gear Xrd -REVELATOR- (2015), Ky Kiske
 Warriors All-Stars (2017), Yukimura Sanada
 Super Smash Bros. Ultimate (2019), Solo (Dragon Quest IV)
 Jump Force (2019), Future Trunks
 Super Robot Wars T (2019), Saizo Tokito
 Dragon Ball Z: Kakarot (2020), Future Trunks, Trunks (Kid), Gotenks, Opa
 Saint Seiya: Rising Cosmo (2020), Capricorn Shura
 Guilty Gear -STRIVE- (2021), Ky Kiske

Unknown date
 Dragon Ball series (Trunks)
 Guilty Gear series (Ky Kiske, Robo-Ky)
 Samurai Warriors series (Yukimura Sanada)
 Samurai Warriors: Spirit of Sanada (Yukimura Sanada)
 Tales of Phantasia (Cless Alvein (Cress Albane) & Chester Burklight (Chester Barklight))
 Warriors Orochi series (Yukimura Sanada)

Tokusatsu
 B-Robo Kabutack (1997), Kabutack, Professor (actor), Junichiro Kokuritsu (actor)
 Voicelugger (1999), Voicelugger Sapphire/Takeshi Tenma (actor)
 Tokusou Sentai Dekaranger (2004), Bokudenian Biskes (ep. 44)
 Mahou Sentai Magiranger (2005), Magical Cat Smoky (eps. 19 - )
 Juken Sentai Gekiranger (2007), Pyon Biao (eps. 20 - )
 Tokumei Sentai Go-Busters (2012), Jishakuloid (ep. 23)
 Unofficial Sentai Akibaranger (2012), various Sentai male voices, Kameari Alpaca (human form)
 Zyuden Sentai Kyoryuger (2013), Debo Supokoun (ep. 32)
 Kishiryu Sentai Ryusoulger (2019), Pi-Tan (eps. 30 - )/Kishiryu Pterardon (ep 31)/Kishiryu Ptyramigo (Voiced by Masaki Terasoma (Kishiryu Tyramigo)) (ep. 32)

Dubbing
Live-action
 Leonardo DiCaprio
 This Boy's Life (Toby)
 What's Eating Gilbert Grape (Arnold "Arnie" Grape)
 The Basketball Diaries (Jim Carroll)
 Romeo + Juliet (Romeo)
 Titanic (Broadcasting inflight Version) (Jack Dawson)
 Celebrity (Brandon Darrow)
 The Man in the Iron Mask (King Louis XIV/Phillipe)
 American Psycho (Patrick Bateman (Christian Bale))
 The Benchwarmers (Clark Reedy (Jon Heder))
 Brideshead Revisited (Lord Sebastian Flyte (Ben Whishaw))
 Buffy the Vampire Slayer (Oliver Pike (Luke Perry))
 Chuck (Chuck Bartowski (Zachary Levi))
 Fargo (Josto Fadda (Jason Schwartzman))
 The Karate Kid (Daniel LaRusso (Ralph Macchio))
 The Karate Kid Part III (Daniel LaRusso (Ralph Macchio))
 The Namesake (Nikhil "Gogol" Ganguli (Kal Penn))
 Napoleon Dynamite (Napoleon Dynamite (Jon Heder))
 Painted Faces (Teenage Cheng Lung)
 Pleasantville (David/Bud Parker (Tobey Maguire))
 Radio (James Robert "Radio" Kennedy (Cuba Gooding Jr.))
 Shazam! (2021 The Cinema edition) (Shazam (Zachary Levi))
 Stuck on You (Robert "Bob" Tenor (Matt Damon))
 Willow (Willow Ufgood (Warwick Davis))

Animation
 ¡Mucha Lucha! (Ricochet)
 The Adventures of Tintin'' (Tintin)

References

External links
  
 Takeshi Kusao at GamePlaza-Haruka Voice Acting Database 
 Takeshi Kusao at Hitoshi Doi's Seiyuu Database
 
 

1965 births
Living people
Japanese male video game actors
Japanese male voice actors
Aoni Production voice actors
20th-century Japanese male actors
21st-century Japanese male actors
20th-century Japanese male singers
20th-century Japanese singers
21st-century Japanese male singers
21st-century Japanese singers
Actors from Saitama Prefecture
People from Tokorozawa, Saitama